David McKendree Key (February 4, 1900 – July 15, 1988) of Tennessee, a descendant of David M. Key, served as United States Ambassador to Burma from April 1950 to October 1951, and later as the Assistant Secretary of State for International Organization Affairs of the State Department. He graduated from Harvard College.

External links
 https://web.archive.org/web/20021117075817/http://www.state.gov/r/pa/ho/po/com/10404.htm
 https://www.nytimes.com/1988/07/17/obituaries/david-mck-key-88-a-former-ambassador.html

1900 births
1988 deaths
Ambassadors of the United States to Myanmar
Harvard College alumni
United States Foreign Service personnel